These are the results for the 25th edition of the Ronde van Nederland cycling race, which was held from August 20 to August 25, 1985. The race started in Winschoten (Groningen) and finished in Den Bosch (North Brabant).

Stages

20-08-1985: Winschoten-Winschoten (Prologue), 6.6 km

21-08-1985: Assen-Nijmegen, 250 km

22-08-1985: Nijmegen-Schagen, 251 km

23-08-1985: Schagen-Den Haag, 181 km

24-08-1985: Den Haag-Zundert, 227 km

25-08-1985: Breda-Den Bosch, 123 km

25-08-1985: Oss-Den Bosch (Team Time Trial), 36.4 km

Final classification

External links
Wielersite Results

Ronde van Nederland
August 1985 sports events in Europe
1985 in road cycling
1985 in Dutch sport